The Saskatchewan New Democratic Party (NDP) is a social-democratic political party in the Canadian province of Saskatchewan. It currently forms the official opposition, but has been a dominant force in Saskatchewan politics since the 1940s. The party is the successor to the Saskatchewan section of the Co-operative Commonwealth Federation (CCF), and is affiliated with the federal New Democratic Party.

History

Precursors

The origins of the party began as early as 1902. In that year a group of farmers created the Territorial Grain Growers' Association. The objective of this group was to lobby for farmer's rights with the grain trade and the railways. The name was changed to the Saskatchewan Grain Growers' Association (SGGA) when Saskatchewan became a province in 1905.

In 1921 a left-wing splinter group left the SGGA to form the Farmer's Union. However, the two groups reconciled in 1926 and reformed as the United Farmers of Canada (Saskatchewan Section) (UFC). The first leader of the UFC was George Williams.

The Progressive Party of Saskatchewan, a farmers' movement, elected six MLAs in the 1921 provincial election as well as in the 1925 election and five in 1929 but were never able to field candidates in more than half a dozen of the province's 63 ridings. After the 1929 provincial election returned a Liberal minority government, the Progressives joined with the Conservatives to defeat the Liberals and form a coalition government dominated by the Tories. The Progressives disappeared over the course of the next four years and were largely absorbed by the Tories.

The rightward drift of the Progressives prompted the UFC-SS to decide, in 1930, to run its own candidates in the following election. In 1931, the UFC participated in the March on Regina to protest against government indifference to the farmer's plight during the depression. During that event the UFC met with the Independent Labour Party, led by M.J. Coldwell, to discuss their options. From that meeting they agreed to form the Farmer-Labour Group (FLG) with Coldwell as the leader. The new party acquired its first member in the Saskatchewan legislature when Jacob Benson, elected as a Progressive in 1929, joined to become a Farmer-Labour MLA.

The FLG participated in the 1934 provincial election and won five seats and became the official opposition to the Liberals. Coldwell failed to win a seat but remained as leader.

Founding of the CCF
Following the election, the Farmer-Labour Group officially became the Saskatchewan section of the Co-operative Commonwealth Federation (CCF), although it had been known unofficially as the CCF's Saskatchewan wing before that.

In 1935, Coldwell ran for federal office in the 1935 federal election and was elected. Williams took over as party leader. Williams' radicalism caused moderates in the party to believe that the CCF could not form government with him as leader while his unwavering support for the war alienated pacifists, one of whom, Professor Carlyle King, unsuccessfully challenged Williams for the party presidency (but not the leadership) in 1940 gaining one third of the vote. Tommy Douglas, a charismatic federal CCF MP, was persuaded to challenge Williams for the leadership and succeeded in defeating him for the party presidency in 1941 and for the party leadership in 1942.

CCF in provincial government
In the 1944 election, the Saskatchewan CCF, led by Tommy Douglas, swept to power. They took 47 out of 52 seats to form the first socialist government in Canada or the United States. In the process, they handed the Liberals the second-worst defeat that a sitting government has ever suffered in Saskatchewan. Since that election, the CCF/NDP has won 12 out of 19 elections and held power for 47 of 73 years (as of 2017).

Arguably, the party's greatest accomplishment was the introduction of North America's first comprehensive system of public medical insurance or Medicare. The fight to introduce Medicare in the province was intense, due to the opposition of the province's doctors who were backed by the American Medical Association. The AMA feared that public health care would spread to other parts of the continent if introduced in one part. In July 1962 the doctors staged the 23-day Saskatchewan doctors' strike. But despite a concerted attempt to defeat the controversial Medical Care Insurance Act, the strike eventually collapsed and the College of Physicians and Surgeons of Saskatchewan agreed to the alterations and terms of the "Saskatoon Agreement". The program was introduced and became so popular it was soon adopted across Canada.

After doing much of the preliminary work on Medicare, Douglas resigned as party leader and Premier of Saskatchewan in 1961 to become the founding leader of the New Democratic Party (NDP). The NDP had been formed by a coalition of the CCF and the Canadian Labour Congress. In the same year, the party adopted the awkwardly naming of the Co-operative Commonwealth Federation, Saskatchewan Section of the New Democratic Party or NDP-CCF for short. At the convention in November 1967, the current name was adopted after some heated discussions.

The turmoil of the Medicare fight took its toll, however, and the NDP-CCF government of Douglas' successor Woodrow S. Lloyd was defeated by Ross Thatcher's Saskatchewan Liberal Party in the 1964 election.

Saskatchewan New Democratic Party

The NDP rebuilt itself and went through a painful confrontation between a left-wing movement dubbed "The Waffle" (a name possibly derived from Toronto leftist economist James Laxer's quip that if he was perceived to be "waffling" on a policy question, then he'd "rather waffle to the left than waffle to the right") and the more centrist-oriented party establishment. The party returned to power in the 1971 election, under Allan Blakeney, embarking on a programme of nationalizing the province's natural resources. This saw the creation of parastatal or Crown corporations that drilled for oil (Saskatchewan Oil & Gas Corporation or SaskOil), mined potash (the Potash Corporation of Saskatchewan) and sought hard-rock minerals (the Saskatchewan Mining Development Corp.). Blakeney's government was heavily defeated in the 1982 election by the Progressive Conservative Party of Saskatchewan, led by Grant Devine. The NDP was cut down to only nine seats, the worst defeat a sitting CCF/NDP government had suffered in Saskatchewan.

Despite the size of the defeat, Blakeney continued to lead the NDP in opposition. In the 1986 election, the NDP not only regained much of what it had lost four years earlier, but actually won the popular vote. However, much of the NDP's margin was wasted on large margins in Regina and Saskatoon; while the party won eight seats each in the province's two largest cities, it only won nine seats in the rest of the province. This left the NDP eight seats short of making Blakeney premier again. In a sense, this marked a turning point for a party that had begun as a voice for rural discontent.

Blakeney resigned in early 1987 and was succeeded by Roy Romanow, who led the party back to power in 1991. The Romanow government was more fiscally conservative than previous CCF/NDP governments, and instituted a program of hospital closures, program cuts, and privatizations to eliminate the budget deficit and reduce debt inherited from previous governments. Romanow later quipped that he was a supporter of Tony Blair's Third Way concept before it even existed, and there were many who doubted the party's continued commitment to social democracy. The NDP's Third Way alienated some of its left-wing members, who left the party and merged with the Green Party supporters to form the New Green Alliance.

Recent history
In the 1999 provincial election, Romanow's NDP received slightly less popular support as a share of the vote than the conservative opposition Saskatchewan Party led by Elwin Hermanson, a former Reform Party of Canada MP. Romanow and his government formed a coalition government with the three elected Liberal MLAs; one, Jack Hillson, subsequently left cabinet to sit as an independent Liberal in opposition. Jim Melenchuk and Ron Osika remained in the coalition and ran under the NDP banner in the 2003 provincial election, where both were defeated.

Romanow retired in 2001 and was succeeded by Lorne Calvert, who led the party into the 2003 general election. In an upset, the NDP not only retained power, but was able to form a government on its own with a majority in the Legislative Assembly of Saskatchewan of two seats (30–28). However, in what proved to be a harbinger of things to come, all of the NDP's federal MPs from Saskatchewan lost their seats in the 2004 federal election. They had been steadily losing support at the federal level since 1993, when much of their rural support bled to the Reform Party. The federal NDP didn't win any federal seats in the province again until 2015, when the 2012 federal electoral redistribution allowed them to pick up three seats.

The party's tenure in office ended with the 2007 general election, when the Saskatchewan Party under leader Brad Wall won 38 of the 58 seats. Reduced to official opposition leader, Calvert said he had no immediate plans to step down as NDP leader, but would likely not lead the party into the next election.

In 2008, Calvert announced his intention to leave the leadership of the Saskatchewan NDP and a leadership race commenced with declared candidates including Moose Jaw MLA Deb Higgins, former Deputy Premier and farmer, Dwain Lingenfelter, doctor and community activist Ryan Meili and former party President and Regina lawyer, Yens Pedersen. Lingenfelter was elected party leader June 6, 2009.

The 2011 election proved a heavy blow for the party. The Saskatchewan Party consolidated its grip on power, winning the third-largest majority government in the province's history. Lingenfelter lost his own seat, thus becoming the first CCF/NDP leader in 60 years to have not served as premier. The NDP was reduced to nine seats, its worst showing in 30 years. With deputy leader Higgins having lost her seat as well, John Nilson was named interim leader. A permanent leader was chosen on March 9, 2013; with Nilson bowing out of the race; second-term MLA Cam Broten was elected the party's new leader.

After the 2016 election, the Saskatchewan NDP only captured one additional seat from the previous election, giving them ten seats opposed to the nine the party won in 2011. The disappointing election results as well as Cam Broten's loss in Saskatoon Westview resulted in his resignation as leader on April 11, 2016. On April 15, 2016, Trent Wotherspoon was chosen by the NDP caucus to be the leader of the Official Opposition for the 28th Saskatchewan Legislative Assembly, and was later elected as the party's interim leader on April 23, 2016.  On June 20, 2017, Wotherspoon stepped down as interim leader to enter the leadership election, and was succeeded by Nicole Sarauer who held both roles (Opposition leader and interim party leader) until March 3, 2018, when Ryan Meili, MLA for Saskatoon Meewasin and runner-up in the 2009 and 2013 leadership elections, was elected leader over Wotherspoon with 55% of the vote. Meili, a Saskatoon family doctor, had been elected MLA in a by-election one year and one day before being elected leader.

At the 2020 provincial election, the Saskatchewan Party was re-elected to its fourth consecutive majority government. The NDP won three additional seats in Saskatoon and Regina and once again formed the Official Opposition. Ryan Meili was re-elected in his district of Saskatoon Meewasin, becoming the first leader to retain his seat since former Premier Lorne Calvert in 2007.

In February 2022, Ryan Meili resigned as party leader. A leadership election was held on June 26 in Regina pitting Carla Beck against Kaitlyn Harvey. Beck was elected as the first female leader of the party at this convention. The party is said to face a challenging general election as membership decreased markedly from the previous leadership convention. The 2018 Saskatchewan New Democratic Party leadership election revealed that there were 13,414 party members, with 10,837 members voting. The most recent convention revealed that there were 7,294 party members, with 4,741 members voting. Party membership decreased by over 6,000, with less total votes cast in 2022 than were cast in 2018 for the second place candidate.

Party leaders
† denotes acting or interim leader

Bold denotes position as Premier

CCF

NDP

Election results

(Results shown are for Farmer-Labour Group in 1934, CCF from 1938 to 1960, CCF-NDP in 1964, NDP since 1967.)

Current Saskatchewan New Democrat MLAs

Wings

Saskatchewan Young New Democrats (SYND)
The Saskatchewan Young New Democrats (SYND) is the official youth wing of the Saskatchewan NDP. All party members from the ages of 13 to 25 are automatically recognized as a member of the Saskatchewan Young New Democrats. The elected executive and general members meet on a regular basis and work to establish social change. They also have an annual convention during which they elect the executive members and discuss policies relating to their concerns.

See also
 List of articles about Saskatchewan CCF/NDP members
 Saskatchewan CCF/NDP leadership elections
 List of political parties in Saskatchewan
 Politics of Saskatchewan

Notes

References

External links

Saskatchewan NDP caucus site

 
Political parties established in 1932
Social democratic parties in Canada
Organizations based in Regina, Saskatchewan